Qaleh Sefid (also Romanized as Qal‘eh Sefīd, Qal‘eh Safīd, and Qal‘eh-ye Safīd) is a village in Talkhuncheh Rural District, in the Central District of Mobarakeh County, Isfahan Province, Iran. At the 2006 census, its population was 190, in 51 families.

References 

Populated places in Mobarakeh County